Cesare Maestri (born 12 November 1993) is an Italian male long-distance runner, mountain runner and snowshoe runner who won, at individual senior level, World Snowshoe Championships (2019) and a silver medal at the 2019 World Mountain Running Championships and 2018 European Mountain Running Championships.

National titles
He won two national championships at individual senior level.
Italian Mountain Running Championships
Mountain running: 2019
Italian Long Distance Mountain Running Championships
Long distance mountain running: 2017

See also
 Italy at the European Mountain Running Championships

References

External links
 
 
 Cesare Maestri at FIDAL 

1993 births
Living people
Italian male mountain runners
Italian male long-distance runners
Snowshoe runners
Sportspeople from Trentino
21st-century Italian people